Vadym Paramonov (born 18 March 1991) is a Ukrainian professional footballer who plays as a defender for Urartu Yerevan.

Career
Paramonov is a product of the Samara-Meteoryt academy system in his native Pavlohrad.

He spent his career in the Ukrainian Second League and Ukrainian First League, but in July 2018 signed a contract with the Ukrainian Premier League club FC Lviv.

He made his debut for FC Lviv in the Ukrainian Premier League in a winning match against FC Arsenal Kyiv on 22 July 2018.

Honours
Poltava
 Ukrainian First League: 2017–18

Urartu
 Armenian Cup: Runner-up 2021–22

References

External links 
 
 

1991 births
Living people
People from Pavlohrad
Ukrainian footballers
Ukrainian expatriate footballers
FC Dnipro-75 Dnipropetrovsk players
FC Poltava players
FC Lviv players
FC Kolos Kovalivka players
FC Rukh Lviv players
FC Urartu players
Ukrainian Premier League players
Armenian Premier League players
Expatriate footballers in Armenia
Ukrainian expatriate sportspeople in Armenia
Association football defenders
Ukrainian First League players
Ukrainian Second League players
Sportspeople from Dnipropetrovsk Oblast